Class D I of the Royal Bavarian State Railways (Königlich Bayerische Staatsbahn) was a tank locomotive with two coupled axles designed for shunting. As had been specified, these locomotives were simple and robust. They had a double-frame, with water tanks being suspended between the sole bars of the front section. Because the water capacity of 1.74 m3 soon proved too little even for a shunter operating only within the limits of its own station, additional side tanks were added to some engines during the 1880s. The outside Stephenson valve gear moved the valves on top of the horizontal cylinders. The locomotives could be braked using an Exter counterweight brake.

The D I saw shunting duties on small and medium-sized stations, for example in Schwandorf, Straubing or Neumarkt in der Oberpfalz. 13 locomotives were still in service when the Bavarian State Railway transferred to the Deutsche Reichsbahn in 1920. Seven vehicles were allocated numbers in the DRG renumbering plan for steam locomotives, but none were implemented as they were retired in 1923.

See also 
 Royal Bavarian State Railways
 List of Bavarian locomotives and railbuses

Sources 

 
 

0-4-0T locomotives
D 01
Standard gauge locomotives of Germany
Maffei locomotives
Railway locomotives introduced in 1871
B n2t locomotives
Shunting locomotives